Judge Haight may refer to:

Albert Haight, (1842-1926), judge, New York Court of Appeals
Charles S. Haight Jr. (born 1932), American lawyer and federal judge for the United States District Court for the Southern District of New York
Fletcher Mathews Haight (1799–1866), judge of the United States District Court for the Southern District of California
Thomas Griffith Haight (1879-1942), judge of the United States Court of Appeals for the Third Circuit, in New Jersey